Parker Milner (born September 6, 1990) is an American former professional ice hockey goaltender who played in the American Hockey League (AHL).

Milner had a standout collegiate career with Boston College, winning the NCAA Frozen Four and 2012 NCAA Division I Men's Ice Hockey Tournament finals in Tampa, Florida. Boston College coach Jerry York, listed him among elite Boston College goaltenders Scott Clemmensen, Cory Schneider and John Muse.

Playing career

Amateur
Milner first played with the Waterloo Blackhawks in the United States Hockey League. He was the Blackhawks Most Improved Player in the 2008–09 season.

As a junior, playing collegiate hockey with Boston College in the Hockey East, Milner overcame a midseason slump to help his team win the Beanpot trophy.  He had a 25–5 record and a .931 save percentage during the regular season. Milner helped lead his team to a 19-game winning streak including championships at the Beanpot tournament and the 2011-12 National Championship final.

He was named to the 2012 Hockey East Men's Ice Hockey Tournament all tournament team. He was named defensive player of the week February 20, 2012. Milner was also named to the 2011 Ice Breaker All-Tournament Team after Boston College won its third Ice Breaker title by defeating North Dakota 6–2 in Grand Forks, North Dakota.

Professional
Undrafted, on June 30, 2013, Milner signed a one-year American Hockey League contract with the Bridgeport Sound Tigers, an affiliate of the New York Islanders.  He started the season with the Sound Tigers but was later reassigned to the Stockton Thunder, the Islanders' ECHL affiliate.

On August 19, 2014, Milner signed as a free agent to a one-year contract with the Quad City Mallards of the ECHL.

On July 2, 2015, Milner returned to the Sound Tigers of the AHL, agreeing to a one-year contract as a free agent.

As a free agent the following season, Milner joined his third AHL club, in agreeing to a one-year contract with the Hershey Bears on July 7, 2016.

During the 2018–19 season, his third season within the Washington Capitals system, with AHL contracts, Milner was signed to his first NHL contract, agreeing to a one year, two-way deal for the remainder of the season with the parent club. Signed to add an organizational depth in preparation for the playoffs, he was assigned to continue playing in the ECHL with the Stingrays, the ECHL club in the Capitals system.

Having provided the additional depth to the Capitals, Milner continued within the organization in agreeing to a one-year AHL contract with the Bears on May 28, 2019.

After seven professional seasons, Milner opted to retire from professional hockey following the 2019–20 season.  Milner remains connected with the Stingrays as the local emergency backup goaltender.  In his role during the 2020-21 season, Milner suited up four times but did not play as he was not entitled to play under league regulations (only allowed in case of injury or if no goaltender is available because of call ups or other situations). He was on the Stingrays roster for three games—March 14 and 26 versus the Orlando Solar Bears and March 31 against the Greenville Swamp Rabbits.  He also was on the roster for Orlando in their April 14 at the Stingrays

Personal
Milner is from Pittsburgh, Pennsylvania. During the 2010 offseason, Milner and two other Freshman hockey players (Philip Samulesson and Patrick Wey) were involved in an accident when the SUV they were passengers in was hit by a trolley close to the South Street T-stop near Boston College.  Players were treated for minor injuries.

Milner has also become an occasional writer for Vox Media's Easter, often writing both regarding the Charleston area and on road games to local restaurants relative to the venue of the game.

Career statistics

Awards and honors

References

External links 
 

1990 births
American men's ice hockey goaltenders
Boston College Eagles men's ice hockey players
Bridgeport Sound Tigers players
Hershey Bears players
Iowa Wild players
Living people
Missouri Mavericks players
Ice hockey people from Pittsburgh
Quad City Mallards (ECHL) players
South Carolina Stingrays players
Stockton Thunder players
Waterloo Black Hawks players